Mimochariergus carbonelli is a species of beetle in the family Cerambycidae. It was described by Zajciw in 1960. It is named in honour of the Uruguayan entomologist Carlos S. Carbonell (1917–2019).

References

Compsocerini
Beetles described in 1960